Remus Nicolai (born 10 June 1977 in Bistriţa, Romania) is a retired Romanian aerobic gymnast. He had a successful career winning six world championships medals (one gold, two silver and three bronze) and five European championships medals (two gold, two silver and one bronze).   After retiring from aerobic gymnastics he opened together with his wife (Daniela Mărănducă) a private gymnastics club in Constanţa. As of 2013 he trains, together with his wife, the junior artistic women's National Team of Romania at the National Olympic Center in Onesti.

References

External links

1977 births
Living people
Sportspeople from Bistrița
Romanian aerobic gymnasts
Male aerobic gymnasts
Medalists at the Aerobic Gymnastics World Championships
21st-century Romanian people